Katsuo Ōno (大野克夫 Katsuo Ōno) (born September 12, 1939  in Kyoto, Japan) is a Japanese musician and composer who has scored multiple films and anime. His most notable works are theme music of detective drama Taiyō ni Hoero! and anime series Detective Conan.

Also, Katsuo Ōno was a previous former Group music bands The Spiders (Japanese band) from 1961–1970.

Filmography

Music Department

Soundtrack

Self

References

External links
  
 

1939 births
Living people
Japanese film score composers
Japanese male film score composers
Japanese male musicians
Japanese musicians
Musicians from Kyoto Prefecture